Langille may refer to:

People
Carole Glasser Langille, Canadian poet
Edward Langille, university professor
Bill Langille, Canadian politician

Other
Langille Glacier, on Mount Hood in Oregon
Langille Peak, a mountain in California